Podcerkev ( or) is a village west of Stari Trg pri Ložu in the Municipality of Loška Dolina in the Inner Carniola region of Slovenia.

Church

The local church in the settlement is dedicated to Saint Martin and belongs to the Parish of Stari Trg.

Notable people
Notable people that were born or lived in Podcerkev include:
Matija Škerbec (1886–1963), Roman Catholic priest, political figure, and writer

References

External links

Podcerkev on Geopedia

Populated places in the Municipality of Loška Dolina